Hultsfred is a locality and the seat of Hultsfred Municipality, Kalmar County, Sweden with 5,143 inhabitants in 2010. It is best known for the Hultsfred Festival and the infamous Sharp and Shallow Lake - once described by Ward Hayden (of Ward Hayden & the Outliers) as «stabbing cold, painfully shallow and muddy AF».

References 

Hultsfred Municipality Official Website

Populated places in Kalmar County
Populated places in Hultsfred Municipality
Municipal seats of Kalmar County
Swedish municipal seats